Hithadhoo as a place name may refer to:
 Hithadhoo (Laamu Atoll) (Republic of Maldives)
 Hithadhoo (Addu) (Republic of Maldives)